Oscar G. and Mary H. Burch House, also known as the Smith House and Sandy House, is a historic home located in Jefferson City, Cole County, Missouri. It was built in 1869, and is a two-story, Italianate style brick dwelling on a stone foundation. It has a front gable roof and segmentally arched windows.  Also on the property is a contributing garage.

It was listed on the National Register of Historic Places in 2003.

References

Houses on the National Register of Historic Places in Missouri
Italianate architecture in Missouri
Houses completed in 1869
Buildings and structures in Jefferson City, Missouri
National Register of Historic Places in Cole County, Missouri